Jodie Ingles is an Australian cardiac researcher and professor. They head the Clinical Cardiac Genetics Group in the Molecular Cardiology Program at the Centenary Institute of Cancer Medicine and Cell Biology in Sydney, Australia.

Career 

In 2016, Ingles led a survey study which outlined the need for better psychological support for families affected by sudden cardiac death due to a genetic heart disease. This study identified a significant risk for post-traumatic stress and prolonged grief for family members after the sudden cardiac death of a young relative.

Ingles's work in 2018 highlighted an increase in ICD insertion in a study that looked into whether this was caused by increased awareness of risk factors for sudden death, and highlighted an unexpectedly high rate of ICD removals.

Awards 
 Clinical Trials and Cohort Studies Grant in excess of $2m from the National Health and Medical Research Council (NHMRC)

References 

Australian cardiovascular researchers
Living people
Year of birth missing (living people)